Stephanie Ulbrich (born January 8, 1950) is an American politician who served in the Delaware House of Representatives representing the 25th district from 1995 to 2007.

References

1950 births
Living people
People from Bloomington, Illinois
Women state legislators in Delaware
Republican Party members of the Delaware House of Representatives
21st-century American women